Jesús Julián Lucendo (born 19 April 1970) is a former Andorran national footballer of Spanish origin.  He made 27 appearances internationally for Andorra. He had an extensive club career as well, including one season with FC Barcelona. He retired in November 2003 due to a knee injury.

International statistics
Updated 28 September 2014."

International goalsScores and results list Andorra's goal tally first.''

References

External links

1970 births
Living people
FC Barcelona players
FC Andorra players
Andorran footballers
Spanish footballers
Andorra international footballers
La Liga players
FC Santa Coloma players
Association football midfielders
Segunda División B players
FC Barcelona C players
Tercera División players
Footballers from Castilla–La Mancha
Andorran expatriate sportspeople in Spain
Expatriate footballers in Spain
Andorran expatriate footballers